This is a list of fellows of the Royal Society elected in 1771.

Fellows
 John Wynn Baker (d. 1775), agriculture economist
 Peter Biron, Duke of Courland (1724–1800), German duke
 Alexander Dalrymple (1737–1808), Scottish geographer
 William Duncan, (c.1715–1774), physician and speculator
 Robert Erskine (1735–1780), Scottish engineer
 John Frere (1740–1807), antiquary
 Richard Cope Hopton (c.1738–1810)
 Samuel Howard (c.1731–1811), surgeon
 John Glen King (1732–1787), cleric and antiquarian
 John Philip de Limbourg (1726–1811)
 Francis Maseres (1731–1824), lawyer
 Paul Henry Maty (1745–1787), librarian
 John Paradise (1743–1795)
 James Petty (d. 1822)
 Constantine Phipps, 2nd Baron Mulgrave (1744–1792)
 Marcin Odlanicki Poczobutt (1728–1810), Polish astronomer
 Philip Stephens (1723–1809), MP
 Marmaduke Tunstall (1743–1790), ornithologist
 Thomas Tyrwhitt (1730–1786), classical scholar
 George Walker (c.1734–1807), mathematician
 Benjamin Way (1740–1808), MP

References

1771
1771 in science
1771 in England